The 2005–06 Ligue Magnus season was the 85th season of the Ligue Magnus, the top level of ice hockey in France. 14 teams participated in the league, and Dragons de Rouen won their eighth league title.

Regular season

Playoffs

Relegation

Round 1 
 Chamonix Hockey Club - Gap Hockey Club 3:2 (6:3, 2:3, 2:3, 5:0, 4:3)

Round 2 
 Chamonix Hockey Club - Corsaires de Dunkerque 6:1/3:3

External links 
 Season on hockeyarchives.info

1
Fra
Ligue Magnus seasons